Roy Wilkins (18 April 1892 – 17 July 1965) was an Australian cricketer. He played two first-class matches for Tasmania between 1925 and 1926.

See also
 List of Tasmanian representative cricketers

References

External links
 

1892 births
1965 deaths
Australian cricketers
Tasmania cricketers
Cricketers from Hobart